Scaynes Hill is a  geological Site of Special Scientific Interest north-west of Newick in East Sussex. It is a Geological Conservation Review site.

This disused quarry and road section exposes yellow sandstone of the Grinstead Clay, dating to the Valanginian stage around 135 million years ago. The sandstone was deposited by a meandering river.

References

Sites of Special Scientific Interest in East Sussex
Geological Conservation Review sites